L. exigua may refer to:

 Laemodonta exigua, an air-breathing snail
 Leavenworthia exigua, a flowering plant
 Lebia exigua, a ground beetle
 Lecanactis exigua, a lichenized fungus
 Lepanthes exigua, a flowering plant
 Leptanilla exigua, a North African ant
 Leptogorgia exigua, a Pacific coral
 Lissotesta exigua, a sea snail
 Lomanella exigua, a daddy longlegs
 Lycosa exigua, a wolf spider